Talal Al Amer (born 22 February 1987) is a Kuwaiti footballer who is a midfielder for the Kuwaiti Premier League club Al Qadsia.

References

1987 births
Living people
Kuwaiti footballers
Qadsia SC players
Kuwait international footballers
2011 AFC Asian Cup players
2015 AFC Asian Cup players
Footballers at the 2006 Asian Games
Sportspeople from Kuwait City
Association football midfielders
Asian Games competitors for Kuwait
AFC Cup winning players